Richard Leslie Byrd (May 16, 1892 – June 20, 1958) was an American athlete and baseball player who won the silver medal in the discus throw at the 1912 Summer Olympics. He finished fourth in the standing high jump, eighth in the standing long jump and 17th in the two handed discus throw event. At the same Olympics he also was a member of USA national baseball team which competed in a single baseball match held as  demonstration sport.

References

External links
Richard Byrd's profile at Sports Reference.com
Richard Byrd's profile at Find-a-Grave

1892 births
1958 deaths
People from Sullivan County, Indiana
American male discus throwers
Baseball players from Indiana
Baseball players at the 1912 Summer Olympics
Athletes (track and field) at the 1912 Summer Olympics
Olympic baseball players of the United States
Olympic silver medalists for the United States in track and field
Medalists at the 1912 Summer Olympics